These states are the administrative divisions of the Federated States of Micronesia:

References

 
States, Micronesia, Federated States of